Waterford Lakes Town Center is an outdoor mall in the Orlando, Florida metropolitan area. The mall is located a few miles south of the University of Central Florida on North Alafaya Trail, just off Florida State Road 408, and is frequented by college students.

Anchors and Major Tenants
Regal Cinemas
Barnes & Noble
Bed Bath and Beyond
Ashley HomeStore
Target
TJ Maxx
Best Buy
PetSmart
Five Below
Forever 21
Torrid

Restaurants
Five Guys
Pizza Hut
Chick-fil-A
TGI Friday's
Longhorn Steakhouse
Miller's Ale House
Panera Bread 
Cooper's Hawk
Zoes Kitchen
Little Greek Fresh Kitchen

Former Tenants
Aeropostale - Closed 2016
MovieStop - Closed 2016
The Children's Place - Closed January 28, 2017
Romano's Macaroni Grill - Closed January 30, 2015
Johnny Rockets - Closed October 2008
Barnes & Noble - Closed 2021

References

Buildings and structures in Orlando, Florida
Shopping malls in Florida
Tourist attractions in Orlando, Florida
Shopping malls established in 1999
1999 establishments in Florida